Orkan-e Tork (also known as Organ-e Tork) is a village in Khandan Rural District, Tarom Sofla District, Qazvin County, Qazvin Province, Iran. At the 2006 census, its population was 131, in 35 families.

References 

Populated places in Qazvin County